He Yifan born in Yibin, Sichuan is a Chinese singer, songwriter, rapper, dancer, and actor.

Career
On 18 October 2016, He appeared as a member of the music group SWIN-S.

Discography

Album/EP

SWIN-S

SWIN

Single
Not Include in Any Album

Filmography

Online drama

Variety show

References

External links

1998 births
Living people
People from Yibin
21st-century Chinese male singers
21st-century Chinese actors
Chinese songwriters
Chinese rappers
Singers from Sichuan
Musicians from Sichuan
Actors from Sichuan
Hip hop singers
Chinese idols
Mandarin-language singers
Chinese dancers